Edith Hudson (born 1872) was a British nurse and suffragette. She was an active member of the Edinburgh branch of the Women's Social and Political Union (WSPU) and was arrested several times for her part in their protests in Scotland and London. She engaged in hunger strikes while in prison and was forcibly fed. She was released after the last of these strikes under the so-called Cat and Mouse Act. Hudson was awarded a Hunger Strike Medal 'for Valour' by the WSPU.

Early life and career
Hudson was born in 1872. She worked as a nurse in Edinburgh but gave up her profession to dedicate herself to the women’s suffrage movement.

Campaign for women's suffrage
Hudson was an active member of the Edinburgh branch of the Women's Social and Political Union and engaged in protests in Scotland and London. She hosted meetings of the Edinburgh WSPU at her home in Melville Place. She was arrested for the first time in Edinburgh in December 1909 at a demonstration where Liberal MP Sir Edward Grey was delivering a speech. Hudson addressed a large crowd before making her way to the theatre and becoming engaged in scuffles with police who were blocking the way.
 
She was charged with committing a breach of the peace and pled guilty, but claimed her actions were “purely political” and necessary as “the Government at present had refused to hear any questions about women’s franchise that were put in a constitutional and peaceful manner.” She was given a £5 fine or 30 days' imprisonment. Hudson opted to go to prison and was removed to Calton Jail with a fellow suffragette Elsie Roe-Brown. Members of the Edinburgh WSPU gathered at the walls of Calton Jail to give them “an encouraging cheer”.
  
On 21 November 1911, Hudson was among the 223 protesters arrested at a WSPU demonstration at the House of Commons, to which she had travelled with other women from the Edinburgh branch, including Jessie C. Methven, Alice Shipley, Elizabeth and Agnes Thomson and Mrs N Grieve. The demonstrations followed the "torpedoing" of the Conciliation Bill, meant to extend the right to vote to wealthy, property-owning women. Hudson had previously been arrested in London in November 1910.

Hunger strikes

In March 1912, Hudson took part in a militant protest which involved concerted window-smashing in London over three days.

Scottish participants were assigned Kensington High Street. Hudson was arrested, sentenced and sent to Holloway prison. While she was serving her sentence, Emmeline and Christabel Pankhurst were charged with conspiracy and imprisoned in Holloway in April 1912. Suffragette prisoners were instructed by the WSPU to go on hunger strike to protest Mrs Pankhurst's sentence. A fellow Scottish prisoner, Lilias Mitchell, described the forcible feeding of the hunger strikers as "a sort of hell for two hours" and reported that Hudson "fought splendidly - knocked down all the six wardresses & told the doctor what she thought of him!" Mrs Pankhurst was released the following day. All the released prisoners were presented with an "illuminated address" designed by Sylvia Pankhurst and signed by Emmeline.

In May 1913 Hudson was charged with attempting to set fire to Kelso Racecourse stand, along with Arabella Scott and Elizabeth and Agnes Thomson, and was sentenced to nine months imprisonment in Calton Jail. The women immediately went on hunger strike. After seven days, Hudson and the other female prisoners were released under The Prisoners (Temporary Discharge for Ill Health) Act 1913, also known as the Cat and Mouse Act, which had recently been introduced to allow prisons to release women whose hunger strike had reached a critical stage. They were released on licence, to return when their health improved. No attempt had been made to forcibly feed them.

After her release Hudson stayed at the home of Dr Grace Cadell, which was used as a refuge for suffragettes. She was interviewed there by a journalist who described her as "a woman of fine physique" who would soon be to fit enough to return to Calton for "further martyrdom". None of the women returned to prison when their licenses expired and Hudson subsequently “vanished”.

Like many suffragettes at the time, Hudson used an alias to evade the police and went by Mary Brown. For this reason it is likely that she is noted twice on the Roll of Honour of Suffragette Prisoners. She was remembered by a fellow suffragette as "about the most gentle person I knew".

See also
 List of suffragists and suffragettes
 Women's Social and Political Union
 Timeline of women's suffrage

References 

Scottish suffragists
Year of death missing
Scottish nurses
British women nurses
Hunger Strike Medal recipients
Scottish suffragettes
Women's Social and Political Union
1872 births
People associated with Edinburgh
Hunger strikers